Zhangiztobe Solar Plant is a photovoltaic power station with a total capacity of 30MW which corresponds to an annual production of approximately 38.9 GW. It is located in Zhangiztobe (East Kazakhstan Region). The plant reduces carbon emissions in the country by 31,650 tonnes per year.

References

External link 

 Interactive scholarly application, multimodal resources mashup (publications, images, videos).

Photovoltaic power stations
Solar power stations in Kazakhstan
Energy infrastructure completed in 2019
2019 establishments in Kazakhstan